Count Imre Festetics de Tolna (1764 – 1847) was a noble landowner and geneticist.

Scientific works
Many of the central principles the discipline of genetics were formulated by Imre Festetics through the study of sheep. Festetics formulated a number of rules of heredity and was the first to refer to these as "genetic laws of nature" (Die genetischen Gesetze der Natur). In so doing he used the term genetic for the first time, 80 years before William Bateson did so in his personal letter to Adam Sedgwick. Festetics created this new term to clearly distinguish his rules of heredity, or genetic laws,
from the physiological laws of Ehrenfels.

Genetic Laws of Nature
 Healthy plants and robust animals are able to propagate and inherit their specific characteristics.
 Traits of grandparents that are different from those of the immediate progeny may reappear in later generations.
 Animals possessing desirable traits that have been inherited over many generations can sometimes have offspring with divergent traits. Such progeny are variants or freaks of nature, and are unsuitable for further propagation if the aim is the heredity of specific traits.
 A precondition for successful application of inbreeding is scrupulous selection of stock animals.

In these ‘‘Genetic Laws,’’ Festetics was the first to recognize empirically the segregation of characters in the second hybrid generation. He also linked heredity (vererbung) with health and vigor independently of external factors, stressing the role of inbreeding (combined with strong selection) in stabilizing character inheritance for preserving or developing new races. To illustrate the concept he used sheep, chicken, cattle and horse breeds as examples, although he also applied it to the human species by considering populations of isolated Hungarian villages, in which he had observed degenerative mental and physical characteristics. Festetics’s observations highlighted important correlations between variability, adaptation, and development. He also noted the consequences of selection and its role in heredity, believing that variability and his postulated laws of genetics were connected, acting together in breeding as well as in the natural processes controlling populations of different animals, including humans.

Festetics, however, was ultimately hindered by the complex nature of his study traits, aspects of wool quality that we now know to be polygenic.

When Gregor Mendel turned his attention to inheritance in peas he was just the latest in a line of Moravian researchers and agriculturalists who had been thinking about inheritance, and many of the principles had already been sketched out by Festetics

References

 Poczai P, Bell N, Hyvönen J (2014) Imre Festetics and the Sheep Breeders' Society of Moravia: Mendel's Forgotten “Research Network”. PLoS Biol 12(1): e1001772. doi:10.1371/journal.pbio.1001772
 Die genetische Gesätze der Natur. Oekonomische Neuigkeiten und Verhandlungen, 1819.
 Szabo´ AT (2009) Phaseolus as a model taxon for monitoring trends in European home garden diversity: a methodological approach and proposal. Bailey A, Eyzaguirre P, Maggioni L, editors. Crop genetic resources in European home gardens. Proceedings of a Workshop, 3–4 October 2007, Ljubljana, Slovenia. Rome: Biodiversity International (IPGRI) Press. pp. 37–54.

1764 births
1847 deaths
Imre
Hungarian scientists